The Lottery Man (1916 film)
 The Lottery Man (1919 film)